Robert Taylor Jones (1884 – 1958), American politician, Governor of Arizona 
 Robert Thomas Jones (engineer) (1910 – 1999), aerodynamicist and aeronautical engineer for NACA and later NASA